Sumaira Zareen (Sindhi: ثميره زرين ) (February 1944 - 13 August 1977) was a leading story writer of Sindh, Pakistan. She was one of the pioneers' women of Sindhi literature. She is popularly called First Lady of Sindhi Literature. Two of her story collections have been published.

ِChildhood 
Sumaira Zareen was born on 22 February 1944 in a literary family at Shikarpur Sindh, Pakistan. Her real name was Sakina Aiwan. Her father's name was Muhammad Azam Aiwan. Her grandfather Muhammad Arif Aiwan himself was a renowned poet of his time.

Literary Contributions 
She started writing stories at the age of 12 or 13 years. Her first story was published in famous Sindhi magazine Naeen Zindagi (New Life). She served as In-Charge of Women's page of daily Hilal-e-Pakistan. After graduation, she worked as Research Fellow at the Institute of Sindhology. She compiled and published stories published in the Naeen Zindagi Magazine from 1947 to 1960. The title of the collection was  Mehran Joon Chholiyoon (Waves in the Indus) and it was published in 1962. In 1970, her story collection  Geet Ujayal More Ja  (songs of thirsty peacocks) was published by Malir Adabi Academy Hyderabad.  Her following story collections were published after her death:
 Aaoon Uhai Marvi (I am the same Marvi)
 Roshan Chhanwro (Bright Shade)

Noted writer Nasir Mirza has compiled her unpublished stories and her profile in his book Khatton - e Awal Kahanikara: Sumera Zareen (First Lady of stories: Sumera Zareen). This book has been published in 2018. Famous literary magazine Rachna published a special issue in her memory in 2014.

Death 
Sumaira Zareen died on 13 August 1977.

References 

1944 births
1977 deaths
Pakistani female writers
Writers from Sindh
Sindhi-language writers
Sindhi people
Sindhi female writers
Pakistani women writers